The Pick of Destiny is the second studio album by American comedy rock band Tenacious D, the soundtrack for their feature film of the same name. The album was released on November 14, 2006, through Epic Records, and debuted at number 8 on the Billboard 200.

The Pick of Destiny is the band's first studio release in five years, following up their self-titled debut album in 2001. The album was produced by the Dust Brothers' John King, and includes appearances by Meat Loaf, Ronnie James Dio, and Dave Grohl. Another album, More Rocktastic Music from the Film, contains some small excerpts of the official score that the soundtrack excludes.

Details
In the absence of original comedy skits, there are excerpts of dialogue from the soundtrack's accompanying film between numerous songs. Portions of The Pick of Destiny were recorded at Dave Grohl's studio. A clean version of the album was recorded.

The album was released in three separate edits: the original version comprising the full film versions, a "clean edit" with re-recorded vocals replacing foul language with non-sense words, and a deluxe edition. All three versions contain clips from the movie, but some dialogue was re-recorded for the clean version. The special limited edition was released in a cardboard "old book case", which includes a digipack version of the album, a foldout poster depicting Black and Gass with bigfoot, eight tarot cards from the film (Tenacious D, The Training, Destiny, Masterpiece, The Quest, The Divide, and Two Kings, as well as a card explaining the other cards), and a plastic replica of The Pick of Destiny. If the set was pre-ordered from the Tenacious D website, it also included a T-shirt.

In recent years the song “Kickapoo” has become the unofficial fight song of Kickapoo High School, located in Springfield Missouri. In the music video to the song it shows how they are referring to “Kickapoo” in Missouri, it is unknown if this is referring to the area that the high school is in because there is no town or township in Missouri with the name Kickapoo. This also could come from inspiration from Brad Pitt, Kickapoo High School Alumn and friend of Jack Black frontman of Tenacious D.

Album art
The cover shows Black and Gass in the clouds, parodying Michelangelo's painting The Creation of Adam. In between the two's hands is the Pick of Destiny, the movie's titular artifact, with the devil's arm pictured below them, sticking out from the clouds trying to take the pick.

Apart from the exemption of the parental advisory sticker, there is no difference in the artwork for the clean version of the album.

Publicity
A short film entitled Time Fixers was used as a promotional tool on the iTunes website. The film starred Michael Keaton and longtime collaborators JR Reed and Paul F. Tompkins. The first half of the film was available as a free download on iTunes while the second half could only be accessed after pre-ordering the album.

Track listing

Bonus tracks

Credits
Tenacious D
Jack Black – lead vocals, acoustic guitar
Kyle Gass – backing vocals, acoustic and electric guitar, recorder on "Papagenu (He's My Sassafrass)"

Additional Musicians
John Konesky – electric guitar
Meat Loaf – guest vocals on "Kickapoo"
Ronnie James Dio – guest vocals on "Kickapoo"
John Spiker – bass guitar, backing vocals on "Car Chase City", clavinet on "Papagenu (He's My Sassafrass)"
Liam Lynch – additional guitar on "Beelzeboss (The Final Showdown)" and "Break In-City (Storm the Gate!)"
Dave Grohl – drums, demon vocals on "Beelzeboss (The Final Showdown)"
John King – drum programming on "Papagenu (He's My Sassafrass)"

Production
Produced by John King
Assistant engineers: Ed Cherney, Nick Raskulinecz, John Spiker, Brad Breeck
Recorded at The Dell and 606 Studio
Mixed by Ken Andrews
Mastered by Tom Baker at Precision Mastering
Orchestral arrangements by Andrew Gross, recorded at Sony Scoring Stage, engineered by Casey Stone
Baritone saxophone and piano on "Kickapoo" recorded at Capitol Studios, engineered by Casey Stone
Management: Sam
A&R: Matt Marshall
Music executive: Bob Bowen
Photography: Michael Ellins
Album packaging design by: Gregg Higggins/Michael Elins

Charts

Weekly charts

Year-end charts

More Rocktastic Music from the Film

More Rocktastic Music from the Film is a score album by Andrew Gross and John King for the movie Tenacious D in The Pick of Destiny. It was exclusive to Wal-Mart stores, coming shrink-wrapped with the DVD. The score consists of six orchestral songs written specifically to accompany the film, and two songs by Kyle Gass' band Trainwreck.

Track listing
All songs were written by Andrew Gross and John King, except where noted.

 "The Birth of The D" – 1:26
 "Compared to the Greats" – 0:43
 "The Stranger Suite" – 1:44
 "Guitarway to Heaven" – 0:51
 "Hall of Fame Sneak" – 2:15
 "Capturing The Pick" – 1:03
 "Caveman" – 3:53 (Trainwreck)
 "I Wanna Know" – 3:41 (Trainwreck)

References

External links

Tenacious D albums
Albums produced by John King (record producer)
Comedy film soundtracks
Comedy rock soundtracks
2006 soundtrack albums
Epic Records soundtracks